St. Francis Xavier Church, or Old Bohemia, is a historic Roman Catholic church located at Warwick, Cecil County, Maryland, United States. It is located on what was once the Jesuit estate known as Bohemia Manor.

History
Beginning in 1704 the Society of Jesus bought a farm and initiated missionary activities on the site, thereby establishing a second mission in Maryland half a century after the foundation of the Newtown Manor mission in St. Mary's County, Maryland.

A school here taught many distinguished early American Catholic leaders, including future archbishop John Carroll and his cousin, founding father Charles Carroll. Priests assigned to this mission evangelized in the Delmarva Peninsula, including the modern Archdiocese of Philadelphia and Diocese of Wilmington. Perhaps the most famous grave in the graveyard is of Catherine ("Kitty") Knight (1775-1855), credited for saving an elderly neighbor, a church and much of Georgetown, Maryland during the War of 1812, although her own house burned to the ground.

Structure
The most historic properties on the site are a brick church, constructed shortly after the American Revolutionary War and dedicated in 1797, and an early-19th-century brick rectory connected by a one-story hyphen. The church consists of a four-bay-deep by three-bay-wide brick structure, with a 3-story brick tower added on the southwest facade of the church subsequent to its original building in 1792. The rectory is a five-bay-long, -story brick building with a two-bay-long hyphen on one end and a two-bay-long kitchen on the other. Also on the property is a public graveyard, as well as a relatively modern barn and farmhouse.  A fire gutted the church's interior in 1912, but the church was rebuilt within the old walls. Regular services discontinued in the 1920s, but resumed in modern times.  The Old Bohemia Historical Society, begun by a Catholic, a Quaker and a Methodist in 1954, bought the property's core 120 acres and now maintains the site.

The St. Francis Xavier Church was listed on the National Register of Historic Places in 1975.

See also
 Joseph C. Cann, History of Saint Francis Xavier Church and Bohemia Plantation, Now Known as Old Bohemia, Warwick, Maryland (Old Bohemia Historical Society, 1976)
 Mary DeVine Dunn, Lillian DeVine, St. Francis Xavier Church, Warwick, Maryland, "Old Bohemia": Its History, the Burial Register : Historical Notes (DeWitt Publishing, 1966)
 List of Jesuit sites

References

Bohemia 1704–2004: A History of St. Francis Xavier Catholic Shrine in Cecil County, Maryland. By Thomas J. Peterman. (The Bohemian Historical Society, Devon, Pennsylvania: William T. Cooke Publishing Co. 2004).

External links
, including undated photo, at Maryland Historical Trust
History of St. Francis Xavier Shrine, Old Bohemia, 1704–2004, by Rev. Thomas J. Peterman; St. Dennis Church website

Churches in Cecil County, Maryland
Churches in the Roman Catholic Diocese of Wilmington in Maryland
Historic American Buildings Survey in Maryland
Churches on the National Register of Historic Places in Maryland
Roman Catholic churches completed in 1792
National Register of Historic Places in Cecil County, Maryland
18th-century Roman Catholic church buildings in the United States